Matthew Perry Monument is a statue commemorating Commodore Matthew C. Perry.  The statue is situated in Touro Park facing Bellevue Avenue in the heart of Newport, Rhode Island and was designed by John Quincy Adams Ward in 1869. The pedestal was designed by Richard Morris Hunt.

The statue is described:
Standing figure of Perry wearing his Naval uniform with tassels on the shoulders and a cape jacket draped over his proper right shoulder. His proper left hand rests on the hilt of a sword. The circular base has four bronze bas-reliefs that represent events in Perry's life: Africa (1843), Mexico (1846) and the Treaty with Japan (1[8]54)--Reception of President's letter and negotiation of the Treaty.
—Smithsonian Institution

References

External links
 

1869 establishments in Rhode Island
1869 sculptures
Bronze sculptures in Rhode Island
Monuments and memorials in Rhode Island
Outdoor sculptures in Rhode Island
Sculptures by John Quincy Adams Ward
Sculptures of men in Rhode Island
Statues in Rhode Island